Saint-Malachie is a village of about 1,500 people in the Bellechasse Regional County Municipality, part of the Chaudière-Appalaches administrative region. The Etchemin River goes through the municipality.

History

St. Malachie was colonized by the Irish and Scottish shortly after the War of 1812. The land was given to several British soldiers in the eastern part of the township of Frampton along the Etchemin River.

The land was then given to Gilbert Henderson (1785-1876) who later became the major landowner in this area. The first settlers came mostly from Armagh, a religious town in Northern Ireland. The town was named St. Malachy after the Arch Bishop of Armagh.
The town was civilly erected in 1874, and would later give its name to the municipality of Saint-Malachi-de-Frampton (Frampton Township), but changed once more to St. Malachie in 1948.

The toad invasion of 1873 was quite significant for this town and it is embedded in its culture and history to this day. La Crapaudière, the mountain which was named after the toad invasion, is now a special tourist attraction where people can hike or walk on and enjoy the scenery.

The original St. Malachie cemetery was the first Catholic cemetery in the upper Châteauguay Valley and dates back to the late 1820s. There was not yet an official parish at that time, however the cemetery served all residents in St. Malachie and all surrounding areas. Currently the cemetery site is now privately owned farmland and the monuments have been dispersed locally. In the 1960s, the local parish arranged to establish a commemorative memorial on the side of the road where it was originally located.

Henderson Manor is a historical landmark located along the Etchemin River and the South end of the village.

Coat of arms

The color yellow primarily used in the piece represents Saint-Malachie's dominant industry, which is agriculture (the farming of poultry, dairy, beef and pork products). The two croziers symbolize St. Malachy himself. St. Malachy (1094-1148), the namesake of the municipality, was the Archbishop of Armagh, Ireland. The toad in the coat of arms is representative of the municipality's history, referring to the toad (crapaud in French) infestation of 1873. The toad infestation of 1873 gave rise to the name La Crapaudière, a mountain in the area that was particularly affected by the toad invasion. Finally the shamrocks symbolizes the Irish roots of Saint-Malachy's pioneers.

Geography

St. Malachie is surrounded by Tough Creek and the South Etchemin River, among other bodies of water and lakes. In season, it is a great spot to go hunting and go fishing, most notably for speckled trout.

St. Malachie is also home to Mont Kinsella, a mountain peak which provides a panoramic view of the town. It is ranked as the 871st highest mountain in Quebec.

The Committee footpath is a scenic trail throughout St. Malachie measuring 27.3 kilometers long. It runs along the forest areas and it is equipped with resting areas in places where nature can be easily admired. The footpath is also equipped with stairs and panels which indicate the species and natural vegetation you may see along the path. The footpath is closed during the winter season and reopened in the spring.

Climate

St. Malachie follows the four distinct seasons of spring, summer, winter and fall and it is located in the northeastern tip of North America.

It follows three types of climate throughout the seasons: humid, subarctic and arctic. Daily sunshine duration is eight hours in December, the time of year when it is the shortest.

Community

The small population is renowned for its agriculture and parishes. The religious architectural heritage is very prevalent in this town and displays much of the Irish presence.

One resident of Saint-Malachie is international artist Viviane Gruais Domenge. She paints using mixed media and has had exhibitions in France, Belgium, Italy and across Canada. She paints mostly abstract nature scenes that have been shown around the world 

Two-time Olympic athlete Marie-Michèle Gagnon was born and raised in Lac Etchemin. She is a world-renowned alpine ski racer specializing in slalom. She represented Canada in Vancouver 2010 and Sochi 2014.

In 2009, Portage Rehabilitation Centre was established in St. Malachie. It catered specifically to French-speaking adolescents dealing with drug abuse issues. However, adults and parents of the adolescents can also be provided service at Portage. Residents of Portage partake in socio-economic and socio-cultural activities within St. Malachie such as projects to help and assist with the growth of Atlantic salmon in the Etchemin River and expeditions on the mountains of St. Malachie, including La Crapaudière and Mont Kinsella.

Organizations

St. Malachie has multiple organizations that cater to a large spectrum of people. These include:

 Circle Farming St. Malachie: dedicated to improving lives of women and families through craft heritage
 Knights of Columbus
 Hunting and Fishing Club Inc. 
 Couples Escorts South Shore Regional: service preparation for Christian marriage 
 St. Patrick's Society: organize celebrations for St. Patrick's day and to preserve Irish heritage
 Coupling St. Malachie Club: gathering people interested in horse breeding and promoting the use of horses in leisure 
 Club FADOQ St. Malachie: entertain, inform and enhance the participation of seniors, building a Quebec for all generations.

Demographics 

References

Parish municipalities in Quebec
Incorporated places in Chaudière-Appalaches